Like a River is a 1993 album by the Yellowjackets.

"Like a River" can also refer to:
 A song by Carly Simon on her 1994 album Letters Never Sent
 A song by Will Young on his 2015 album 85% Proof

See also
 Like a Flowing River
 Like a River Runs
 Like a River to the Sea (disambiguation)
 Heart Like a River
 Peace Like a River
 Walk Like a River